Djaledjete Bedalbe (born 22 December 1988) is a Togolese footballer, who plays for Perseru Serui.

Honours

Clubs
Persebaya DU (Bhayangkara F.C.)
 Liga Indonesia Premier Division Champions : 2013

External links 
 Profile at Goal.com

Togolese footballers
1988 births
Living people
Liga 1 (Indonesia) players
Perseru Serui players
People from Lomé
Togolese expatriates in Indonesia
Association football defenders
21st-century Togolese people